The Swinford Townhouses and Apartments are a development of townhouses and apartments in the Loring Park neighborhood of Minneapolis, Minnesota, United States.  Both buildings are located in an area that surrounded the once-elegant Hawthorne Park.  The townhomes were built first, in 1886 by Hodgson & Sons in the Second Empire style, using red brick, stone, and terra cotta.  The apartments were designed in 1897 by locally prominent architect Harry Wild Jones, who preferred an eclectic style.  The building is four stories tall, built of red brick and stone, and features a corner bay.  They were built by Anthony Kelly, a nineteenth-century businessman who pioneered the wholesale grocery business in Minneapolis.  Both the townhouses and the apartments were listed on the National Register of Historic Places in 1990.  The apartments are now incorporated in the Laurel Village development.

References

External links

 Historic Swinfords

National Register of Historic Places in Minneapolis
Renaissance Revival architecture in Minnesota
Houses completed in 1886
Residential buildings on the National Register of Historic Places in Minnesota
Apartment buildings in Minnesota